Richard Francis Dennis Barry III (born March 28, 1944) is an American retired professional basketball player who starred at the NCAA, American Basketball Association (ABA) and National Basketball Association (NBA) levels. Barry ranks among the most prolific scorers and all-around players in basketball history. He is the only one to lead the National Collegiate Athletic Association (NCAA), ABA, and NBA in points per game in a season. He ranks as the all-time ABA scoring leader in regular season (30.5 points per game) and postseason (33.5) play, while his 36.3 points per game are the most in the NBA Finals history. Barry also is the only player to reach the 50-point mark in a Game 7 of the playoffs in either league. He is one of only four players to be a part of a championship team in both leagues.

Barry is widely known for his unorthodox underhand free throw technique. His career .880 free throw percentage ranks No. 1 in ABA history, and his .900 percentage was the best of any NBA player at the time of his retirement in 1980. In 1987, he was inducted into the Naismith Memorial Basketball Hall of Fame. In 1996, he was named one of the 50 Greatest Players in NBA History. In October 2021, Barry was honored as one of the league's greatest players of all-time by being named to the NBA 75th Anniversary Team.

Barry is the father of former professional basketball players Brent Barry, Jon Barry, Drew Barry, and Scooter Barry, and current professional player Canyon Barry. His wife, Lynn Norenberg Barry, was a star basketball player at the College of William & Mary, where she became the first female athlete to have her jersey number (22) retired.

Early years and college career
Barry grew up in Roselle Park, New Jersey, where baseball was his best sport as a youth. He grew up in an urban middle-class neighborhood and was a fan of local New York Giants star Willie Mays, who wore jersey number 24, and Barry would wear the same number in tribute to the outfielder throughout his basketball career. In 1962, Barry graduated from Roselle Park High School.

Barry decided to attend the University of Miami, largely because the Hurricanes adhered to an up-tempo, pro-style system under head coach Bruce Hale that was conducive to his skills and athleticism. It was there that the three-time All-American met his future wife Pamela, who was the daughter of the head coach. As a senior, Barry led the NCAA with a 37.4 points per game average in the 1964–65 campaign. He and his teammates did not take part in the NCAA Tournament, however, because the Hurricanes basketball program was on probation at the time.

Barry was drafted by the San Francisco Warriors with the second pick of the 1965 NBA draft.

Rick Barry was inducted into the University of Miami Sports Hall of Fame in 1976.

Professional playing career

San Francisco Warriors

In Barry's first season in the NBA with the Warriors, the team made a quantum leap from 17 to 35 victories and were in playoff contention until the final game of the regular season. In the All-Star Game one season later, Barry erupted for 38 points as the West team stunned the East team, which featured Wilt Chamberlain, Oscar Robertson, Bill Russell and head coach Red Auerbach among other all-time greats. Later that season, Barry and company extended the mighty Philadelphia 76ers to six highly competitive games in the NBA Finals, something that Russell and the Boston Celtics could not do in the Eastern Conference playoffs.

Nicknamed the "Miami Greyhound" by longtime San Francisco Bay Area broadcaster Bill King because of his long and slender physical build, whippet-like quickness and remarkable instincts, the  Barry won the NBA Rookie of the Year Award after averaging 25.7 points and 10.6 rebounds per game in the 1965–66 season. The following year, he won the 1967 NBA All-Star Game MVP award with a 38-point outburst and led the NBA in scoring with a 35.6 point per game average — which still ranks as the eighth-highest output in league annals.

Along with All-Star center Nate Thurmond, Barry carried the Warriors to the 1967 NBA Finals, which they lost to the Philadelphia 76ers in six games. Despite an injured left knee that required cortisone shots on game days, Barry averaged 40.8 points per game in the series, an NBA Finals record that stood for three decades. "The guy was so good that we had to have three different guys guard him at different times," Chamberlain said. "'Cause he would run them all ragged."

Joining the ABA
At odds with Warriors owner Franklin Mieuli over unpaid incentive monies due him, Barry shocked the basketball world when he jumped to the ABA's Oakland Oaks (as owned by singer Pat Boone), who overwhelmed him with a historic contract offer. Bruce Hale, who coached at Miami and was the father-in-law for Barry, was tapped to serve as head coach. Barry became the first marquee NBA player to jump to the rival league. Barry signed for a salary of $75,000  along with 15% ownership of the Oaks  and 5% of Oaks' gate receipts above $600,000. When asked about the deal, he stated, "I know what a lot of people think of me. They call me a traitor. Is that fair? If they would just look at it the same way they do their own businesses. This is the way I support my family. Why should I be called unloyal? They change their jobs and nobody says they're unloyal. If everything was based just on loyalty, no one would ever make any money."

The courts ordered Barry to sit out the 1967–68 season for the Oaks, upholding the validity of the reserve clause in his contract. At the time, all NBA teams had one-year options on player contracts, however, and the Warriors were quick to exercise theirs. He preceded St. Louis Cardinals' outfielder Curt Flood, whose better-known challenge to the reserve clause went all the way to the U.S. Supreme Court, by two years as the first American major-league professional athlete to bring a court action against it. The ensuing negative publicity cast Barry in a negative light, portraying him as selfish and money hungry. He was hardly alone in his vision, however, as numerous NBA players also saw the rival league as a rare opportunity to enhance their careers.

Oakland Oaks

The Oaks finished 22–56 in their ABA debut, which Barry spent as part of their broadcast team. Prior to the 1968–69 season, they hired his former San Francisco Warriors coach Alex Hannum to replace Hale, who moved to a front office position. If there was any question about whether Barry would remain the most dominant player in professional basketball, he quickly answered it. In his ABA debut, he averaged a league-high 34.0 points per game and the Oaks became the first West Coast team to capture a league championship in professional basketball history. Barry also paced the league in free-throw percentage in the regular season, a feat he would repeat in the 1970–71 and 1971–72 seasons.

Barry had his season come to an abrupt halt on December 27, 1968, when late in a game against the New York Nets, he was blindsided by Ken Wilburn on a drive to the basket and tore left knee ligaments on the play. He attempted to come back in January 1969, only to aggravate the injury and sit out the remainder of the season. He took part in only 35 games but still was named to the ABA All-Star team.

Even without the arguably the best all-around player in basketball, the Oaks barely skipped a beat. They finished with a 60–18 record under Hannum, dominating the Western Division by 14 games over the second-place New Orleans Buccaneers. In the 1969 ABA Playoffs, the Oaks ousted the Denver Rockets in a seven-game series then swept the Buccaneers in the Western Division finals. In the championship round, they made short work of the Indiana Pacers, 4–1, to capture the league title.
 
In lieu of a parade in downtown Oakland, a modest victory celebration was held at a restaurant in Jack London Square. It was there that Barry announced, "I see no hope for the rest of the teams in the league."

Washington Caps
Despite their on-court excellence, the Oaks were a disappointment at the gate, partly because of Barry's absence in the final five months of the season, partly because they were the only ABA member that competed in the same market as an NBA team, that being the more established Warriors across the bay. They averaged just 2,800 fans per home game at the state-of-the-art Oakland-Alameda County Coliseum Arena, slightly more than the league average. By that time, entertainer-business entrepreneur Pat Boone had become the majority team owner, and after more than $2 million in losses over two seasons, he wanted out of the basketball business. In August 1968, the franchise was sold to a group headed by real estate attorney and former Baltimore Bullets owner Earl Foreman, who immediately moved it to Washington, D.C., even though there was no suitable arena in the vicinity at the time.

Reluctantly, Barry played the 1969–70 season with the ABA's Washington Caps. He refused to report to the team at the outset, at one point commenting: "If I wanted to go to Washington, I'd run for president!" He missed the first 32 games before he joined the team, which played in the Western Division, making for a grueling travel schedule. The Caps still managed to finish with a respectable 44–40 record, good for third place in the Western Division. Appearing in only 52 games because of a knee injury, Barry finished the season with 1,442 points (27.7 per game), second-best in the league. The Denver Rockets edged the Caps, 4–3, in the Western Division semifinals. In Game 7 on the road, Barry went off for 52 points, the most scored in a seventh and deciding game in professional basketball history.

Virginia Squires
The Washington Caps became the Virginia Squires after the 1969–70 season, but Barry was openly despondent about playing in Virginia. At the same time, he wanted to continue playing in the ABA. Featured on the August 24, 1970, cover of Sports Illustrated in a Squires jersey, he indicated that he would not return to the NBA if the league paid him "a million dollars a year." He denounced the Squires (and, subsequently, never suited up for them), saying he did not want his kids growing up with a Southern accent. On September 1, 1970, the Squires traded Barry to the New York Nets for a draft pick and $200,000. The negative comments were not the primary reason; rather, Squires owner Earl Foreman was mired in financial troubles and sold Barry to help meet expenses.

New York Nets
After the Squires dealt Barry to the New York Nets, he played in only 59 games in the 1970–71 season because of a knee injury but still made the ABA All Star team. He repeated as an ABA All Star during the 1971–72 season. During the 1970–71 season he led the league in scoring (29.4 points per game) and led the league again in 1971–72 with 31.5 points per game. In both of those years he also led the ABA in free throw percentage as he had in 1968–69. Barry also became the ABA record holder for most consecutive free throws in one game with 23.

In the 1970–71 season, the Nets finished 40–44, good for fourth place in the Eastern Division and a place in the 1971 ABA Playoffs. The Virginia Squires defeated the Nets 4 games to 2 in the Eastern Division semifinals. The 1971–72 Nets finished the season at 44–40, making the 1972 ABA Playoffs by claiming third place in the Eastern Division, 24 games behind the 68–16 Kentucky Colonels. In the Eastern Division semifinals the Nets shocked the ABA by defeating the Colonels 4 games to 2. The Nets then eked out a 4–3 game victory over the Virginia Squires in the Eastern Division finals. The Nets were then edged by the Western Division champion Indiana Pacers, 4 games to 2, in the 1972 ABA Finals.

On June 23, 1972, a United States District Court judge issued a preliminary injunction to prohibit Barry from playing for any team other than the Golden State Warriors after his contract with the Nets ended. On October 6, 1972, the Nets released Barry and he returned to the Warriors.

Golden State Warriors

Upon Barry's return to the Warriors and the NBA, Barry moved his game away from the basket, where he arguably became the first so-called point forward in league history. That is, Barry took on a role similar to that of a point guard and became the chief facilitator of the offense. While his offensive forays were not as frequent as in the past, on March 26, 1974, he scored a career-high 64 points and grabbed 10 rebounds in a 143–120 win over the visiting Portland Trail Blazers.

In training camp before the 1974–75 sesason, Barry was elected captain by his teammates. The Warriors went on to capture the Pacific Division crown as Barry had the best all-around season of his career. He averaged 30.6 points per game. Barry led the league in free throw percentage (.904) and steals per game (2.9) and ranked sixth in assists per game (6.2), the only forward among the top 10 in the category. In the playoffs, the upstart Warriors turned back the Seattle SuperSonics and Chicago Bulls to capture the Western Conference crown. Barry was named NBA Finals Most Valuable Player on the strength of 29.5 points, 5.0 assists and 3.5 steals per game.

In the 1975 NBA draft, the Warriors selected point guard Gus Williams in the first round.  Barry was not required to contribute as much during the 1975–76 season, and his scoring average dipped to 21.0 points per game as a result. Barry's relationship with his teammates continued to deteriorate, to the point where during the final game of the 1976 Western Conference Finals, when Suns rookie Ricky Sobers assaulted Barry away from the ball in the first quarter, none of his teammates came to his aid (in response, Barry took very few shots for the rest of the game, leading to speculation that Barry "quit on the team").

In the 1976–77 season, the Warriors won 46 games the next season with Barry, Smith, and Williams sharing scoring and ball-handling, but were eliminated in the second round by the Los Angeles Lakers. Reportedly, Barry and Williams clashed over the ball-handling role, and Williams was traded after the season to the Seattle SuperSonics. Barry averaged 23.1 points per game in his farewell season (1977–78) with the Warriors.

Houston Rockets
Barry finished his career with the Houston Rockets, playing through the 1979–80 NBA season. The Rockets signed him as a free agent in June 1978, and the league awarded veteran guard John Lucas to the Warriors as compensation.

In the twilight of his career, Barry continued to make history. In his Rockets debut, he assumed a new role as the first player off the bench. It was not long before he elevated the point forward position to another level. Barry finished with a career-high 502 assists to become the first true small forward to reach the 500 mark in one season. Until then, swingman John Havlicek had been the only forward with as many as 500 assists in a season, but the Boston Celtics swingman also spent considerable time at the off guard spot. Barry averaged 13.5 points per game and established a new NBA record (since broken) with a .947 free throw percentage.

Barry was less of a factor in his final season. The Rockets were swept by the Celtics in the 1980 Eastern Conference semifinals, and when contract talks with Boston and the Seattle SuperSonics failed to produce a contract, he decided to retire.

Career statistics

Regular season

|-
|style="text-align:left;"|
|style="text-align:left;"|San Francisco (NBA)
|style="background:#cfecec;"|80* ||  || 37.4 || .439 ||  || .862 || 10.6 || 2.2 ||  ||  || 25.7
|-
|style="text-align:left;"|
|style="text-align:left;"|San Francisco (NBA)
|78 ||  || 40.7 || .451 ||  || .884 || 9.2 || 3.6 ||  ||  || style="background:#cfecec;"|35.6*
|-
|style="text-align:left; background:#afe6fa;"|†
|style="text-align:left;"|Oakland (ABA)
|35 || – || 38.9 || .511 || .300 || style="background:#cfecec;"|.888* || 9.4 || 3.9 ||  ||  || 34.0*
|-
|style="text-align:left"|
|style="text-align:left;"|Washington (ABA)
|52 || – || 35.6 || .499 || .205 || .864 || 7.0 || 3.4 ||  ||  || 27.7
|-
|style="text-align:left;"|
|style="text-align:left;"|New York (ABA)
|59 || – || 42.4 || .469 || .221 || .890 || 6.8 || 5.0 ||  ||  || 29.4
|-
|style="text-align:left;"|
|style="text-align:left;"|New York (ABA)
|80 || – || style="background:#cfecec;"|45.2* || .458 || .308 || .878 || 7.5 || 4.1 ||  ||  || 31.5
|-
|style="text-align:left;"|
|style="text-align:left;"|Golden State (NBA)
|style="background:#cfecec;"|82* ||  || 37.5 || .452 ||  || style="background:#cfecec;"|.902* || 8.9 || 4.9 ||  ||  || 22.3
|-
|style="text-align:left;"|
|style="text-align:left;"|Golden State (NBA)
|80 ||  || 36.5 || .456 ||  || .899 || 6.8 || 6.1 || 2.1 || 0.5 || 25.1
|-
|style="text-align:left; background:#afe6ba;"|†
|style="text-align:left;"|Golden State (NBA)
|80 ||  || 40.4 || .464 ||  || style="background:#cfecec;"|.904* || 5.7 || 6.2 || style="background:#cfecec;"|2.9* || 0.4 || 30.6
|-
|style="text-align:left;"|
|style="text-align:left;"|Golden State (NBA)
|81 ||  || 38.5 || .435 ||  || style="background:#cfecec;"|.923* || 6.1 || 6.1 || 2.5 || 0.3 || 21.0
|-
|style="text-align:left;"|
|style="text-align:left;"|Golden State (NBA)
|79 ||  || 36.8 || .440 ||  || .916 || 5.3 || 6.0 || 2.2 || 0.7 || 21.8
|-
|style="text-align:left;"|
|style="text-align:left;"|Golden State (NBA)
|82 ||  || 36.9 || .451 ||  || style="background:#cfecec;"|.924* || 5.5 || 5.4 || 1.9 || 0.5 || 23.1
|-
|style="text-align:left;"|
|style="text-align:left;"|Houston (NBA)
|80 ||  || 32.1 || .461 ||  || style="background:#cfecec;"|.947* || 3.5 || 6.3 || 1.2 || 0.5 || 13.5
|-
|style="text-align:left;"|
|style="text-align:left;"|Houston (NBA)
|72 ||  || 25.2 || .422 || .330 || style="background:#cfecec;"|.935* || 3.3 || 3.7 || 1.1 || 0.4 || 12.0
|-class=sortbottom
|style="text-align:center;" colspan="2"|Career (NBA)
|794 ||  || 36.3 || .449 || .330 || .900 || 6.5 || 5.1 || 2.0 || 0.5 || 23.2
|-class=sortbottom
|style="text-align:center;" colspan="2"|Career (ABA)
|226 ||  || 41.3 || .477 || .277 || .880 || 7.5 || 4.1 ||  ||  || 30.5
|-class=sortbottom
|style="text-align:center;" colspan="2"|Career (ABA/NBA)
|1.020 ||  || 37.4 || .456 || .297 || .893 || 6.7 || 4.9 || 2.0 || 0.5 || 24.8
|-class=sortbottom
|style="text-align:center;" colspan="2"|All-Star (NBA)
|7 || 6 || 27.8 || .486 ||  || .833 || 4.1 || 4.4 || bgcolor="EOCEF2"|3.2 || 0.1 || 18.2
|-class=sortbottom
|style="text-align:center;" colspan="2"|All-Star (ABA)
|4 || 0 || 20.5 || .432 ||  || .857 || 6.0 || 4.5 ||  ||  || 11.0
|-class=sortbottom
|style="text-align:center;" colspan="2"|All-Star (ABA/NBA)
|11 || 6 || 25.1 || .473 ||  || .842 || 4.8 || 4.4 ||  ||  || 15.6

Playoffs

|-
|style="text-align:left;"|1967
|style="text-align:left;"|San Francisco (NBA)
|15 ||  || 40.9 || .403 ||  || .809 || 7.5 || 3.9 ||  ||  || 34.7
|-
|style="text-align:left;"|1970
|style="text-align:left;"|Washington (ABA)
|7 ||  || 43.1 || .532 || .333 || .912 || 10.0 || 3.3 ||  ||  || 40.1
|-
|style="text-align:left;"|1970
|style="text-align:left;"|New York (ABA)
|6 ||  || 47.8 || .519 || .519 || .814 || 11.7 || 4.0 ||  ||  || 33.7
|-
|style="text-align:left;"|1972
|style="text-align:left;"|New York (ABA)
|18 ||  || 41.6 || .473 || .377 || .856 || 6.5 || 3.8 ||  ||  || 30.8
|-
|style="text-align:left;"|1973
|style="text-align:left;"|Golden State (NBA)
|11 ||  || 26.5 || .396 ||  || .909 || 4.9 || 2.2 ||  ||  || 16.4
|-
|style="text-align:left; background:#afe6ba;"|1975†
|style="text-align:left;"|Golden State (NBA)
|17 ||  || 42.7 || .444 ||  || .918 || 5.5 || 6.1 || 2.9 || 0.9 || 28.2
|-
|style="text-align:left;"|1976
|style="text-align:left;"|Golden State (NBA)
|13 ||  || 40.9 || .436 ||  || .882 || 6.5 || 6.5 || 2.9 || 1.1 || 24.0
|-
|style="text-align:left;"|1977
|style="text-align:left;"|Golden State (NBA)
|10 ||  || 41.5 || .466 ||  || .909 || 5.9 || 4.7 || 1.7 || 0.7 || 28.4
|-
|style="text-align:left;"|1979
|style="text-align:left;"|Houston (NBA)
|2 ||  || 32.5 || .320 ||  || 1.000 || 4.0 || 4.5 || 0.0 || 1.0 || 12.0
|-
|style="text-align:left;"|1980
|style="text-align:left;"|Houston (NBA)
|6 ||  || 13.2 || .364 || .250 || 1.000 || 1.0 || 2.5 || 0.2 || 0.2 || 5.5
|-class=sortbottom
|style="text-align:center;" colspan="2"|Career (NBA)
|74 ||  || 36.8 || .426 || .250 || .875 || 5.6 || 4.6 || 2.2 || 0.8 || 24.8
|-class=sortbottom
|style="text-align:center;" colspan="2"|Career (ABA)
|31 ||  || 43.2 || .497 || .412 || .861 || 8.3 || 3.7 ||  ||  || 33.5
|-class=sortbottom
|style="text-align:center;" colspan="2"|Career (ABA/NBA)
|105 ||  || 38.7 || .448 || .394 || .870 || 6.4 || 4.3 ||  ||  || 27.3

Later years
During the 1990s, he coached the Cedar Rapids Sharpshooters of the Global Basketball Association and the Continental Basketball Association, guiding the Fort Wayne Fury to a 19–37 win–loss record in 1993–94. In 1998 and 1999, he served as head coach of the New Jersey ShoreCats of the United States Basketball League. Former Warriors teammate Clifford Ray was his top assistant.

Barry finished second in his division at the 2005 World Long Drive Championship.

Barry is part owner and promoter for the Ektio basketball shoe, which doctor and former college basketball player Barry Katz designed to reduce ankle injuries. He also serves on the company's board of directors.

Broadcasting career
Barry was among the first professional basketball players to make a successful transition to the broadcasting profession. He began broadcasting during the 1967–68 season broadcasting Oakland Oaks games because of contractual matters that kept him off the court. Barry continues to work in the field, a career that began with his own radio show in San Francisco and CBS while still an active player and then with TBS.

While working as a CBS analyst during Game 5 of the 1981 NBA Finals, Barry made a controversial comment when CBS displayed an old photo of colleague Bill Russell, who is African-American. He tried to joke that "it looks like some fool over there with that big watermelon grin". Barry later apologized for the comment, claiming that he did not realize that a reference to watermelons had racial overtones. Russell said that he believed Barry with regard to Barry's racial attitudes, but nonetheless, the two men are reported not to have been particularly friendly for other reasons, unrelated to that comment.

CBS did not renew Barry's employment for the subsequent season. Producers later cited the general negative tone of his game commentary, which did not sit well with some players and agents around the league. The next season Barry filled in on a few Seattle SuperSonics broadcasts, but a plan for a full-time position fell through when he insisted that his then-wife be allowed to join him when the team was on the road, which would have been contrary to team policy. The next year, Barry was featured in a lengthy Sports Illustrated article written by Tony Kornheiser in which he lamented the failure of his broadcasting career to that point, as well as the fact that he'd left a reputation within NBA circles for being an unlikeable person. After this, Barry worked with TBS and later on, TNT into the 1989–90 season, mostly as a color analyst but sometimes as a play-by-play announcer paired with Bill Russell. One of the more notable games Barry called as play-by-play announcer on TBS was Game 5 of the 1985 Eastern Conference Finals between the Boston Celtics and the Philadelphia 76ers, where Larry Bird made a last-second steal which sealed the win and the Eastern Conference Championship for the Celtics. After the 1989–90 season, Barry became the color analyst for the Atlanta Hawks' games that aired on TBS, paired with Skip Caray.

In a rare non-sports venture, he hosted the pilot for the mid-1980s game show Catchphrase; however, when the series debuted in the fall of 1985, game show veteran Art James replaced him (the series itself was short-lived in the US, but was brought over to the UK and is still running).

In September 2001, Barry began hosting a sports talk show on KNBR in San Francisco until June 2003, when KNBR paired him up with Rod Brooks to co-host a show named Rick and Rod. The show aired on KNBR until August 2006, when Barry left the station abruptly for reasons not disclosed to the public.

Personal life
Barry is of Irish, English, French, and Lithuanian descent. He was a member of the Kappa Sigma fraternity. He resides in Colorado Springs, Colorado with his wife, Lynn Norenberg Barry. While their youngest son, Canyon, played basketball for The University of Florida, to watch him play, they rented a condominium in Gainesville, Florida.

He has four sons and a daughter with his first wife Pam: Scooter, Jon, Brent, Drew and Shannon. All of Barry's sons were professional basketball players. Barry wrote an autobiography, Confessions of a Basketball Gypsy: The Rick Barry Story with Bill Libby that was published in 1972. He also has a son with his third wife, Lynn Barry, Canyon, who is a professional player, playing for Chinese club Hunan Jinjian Miye in the 2018–19 season.

When his son Brent won the NBA Championship in 2005 with the San Antonio Spurs, Rick and Brent became the second father-son duo to both win NBA Championships as players, following Matt Guokas Sr. and Matt Guokas Jr. Later, this would be repeated by Bill and Luke Walton, Mychal and Klay Thompson, and Gary Payton and Gary Payton II.

Jon and Brent have also moved to broadcasting after retirement. Jon serves as a game analyst on ESPN while Brent worked as a studio and game analyst on TNT and NBA TV until 2018 when he took a job with the San Antonio Spurs to be vice president of basketball operations.

Scooter won titles in the CBA and the top Belgian League.

Career achievements
Roselle Park High School – Roselle Park, New Jersey (1957–1961)
Two-time All-State selection
University of Miami (1961–1965)
Associated Press First-Team All-America (1965)
The Sporting News All-America Second Team (1965)
Consensus All-America (1965)
Led the nation in scoring (37.4 ppg) as a senior
NBA San Francisco Warriors (1965–1967)
NBA Rookie of the Year (1966)
NBA All-Rookie First Team (1966)
NBA leading scorer in 1967 (35.6 ppg)
ABA leading scorer in 1969 (34.0 ppg)
NBA highest free-throw percentage 1973, 1975, 1976, 1978, 1979, 1980
ABA highest free-throw percentage 1969, 1971, 1972
NBA All-Star Game MVP (1967)
ABA Oakland Oaks (1968–1969)
ABA Washington Caps (1969–1970)
ABA New York Nets (1970–1972)
NBA Golden State Warriors (1972–1978)
All-NBA Second Team (1973)
NBA Finals MVP (1975)
NBA champion (1975)
NBA Houston Rockets (1978–1979)
All-NBA First Team (1966, 1967, 1974, 1975, 1976)
Eight-time NBA All-Star (1966, 1967, 1973–1978)
ABA All-Star First Team (1969–1972)
NBA 50 Greatest Players (1996)
NBA 75 Greatest Players (2021)
Bay Area Sports Hall of Fame (1988)
Sports Hall of Fame of New Jersey (1994)
University of Miami Sports Hall of Fame (1976)
Golden Plate Award of the American Academy of Achievement (1975)
15 games in NBA career scoring 50 or more points (5th in NBA history)
115 games in professional career scoring 40 or more points — 70 NBA, 45 ABA (4th in professional basketball history after Wilt Chamberlain, Michael Jordan and Kobe Bryant)

NBA records

Regular season
 Only player in history to lead the NCAA, ABA, and NBA in scoring
 Led the NCAA in scoring in 1964–65 (973 points, 37.4 ppg)
 Youngest player to score 57 points in a game:  (57 points, San Francisco Warriors at New York Knicks)
 Free throws, consecutive, ABA game: 23, at Kentucky Colonels, 
 Assists, forward, game: 19, at Chicago Bulls, November 30, 1976

Playoffs
 Scoring 30 or more points in all games, any playoff series: 6 games, vs. Philadelphia 76ers, 1967 NBA Finals
 Points, 7-game ABA series: 281, vs. Denver Rockets, 1970 Semifinals
 Points scored, Game 7, any ABA-NBA playoff series: 52, at Denver Rockets, 
 Field goal attempts, 6-game series: 235, vs. Philadelphia 76ers, 1967 NBA Finals
 Field goal attempts, game: 48, vs. Philadelphia 76ers, 
 Steals, quarter: 4, second quarter, at Chicago Bulls, 
 Tied with many other players

NBA Finals
 Highest scoring average (career): 36.3
 Scoring 30 or more points in all games, any championship series: 6 games, vs. Philadelphia 76ers, 1967 NBA Finals
 Tied with Elgin Baylor, Michael Jordan, Hakeem Olajuwon, Shaquille O'Neal, and Kevin Durant.
 Field goals made, game: 22, vs. Philadelphia 76ers, 
 Tied with Elgin Baylor
 Field goal attempts, 6-game series: 235, vs. Philadelphia 76ers, 1967 NBA Finals
 Field goal attempts, game: 48, vs. Philadelphia 76ers, 
 Field goal attempts, quarter: 17, at Philadelphia 76ers, 
 Steals, 4-game series: 14, vs. Washington Bullets, 1975 NBA Finals (3.5 spg)

NBA All-Star Game
 Highest steals average (career): 3.2
 Field goal attempts, game: 27 (1967)
 Steals, game: 8 (1975)
 Personal fouls, game: 6, twice (1966, 1978)
 Disqualifications, career: 2
 Tied with Bob Cousy

See also
American Basketball Association (2000–present)
List of individual National Basketball Association scoring leaders by season
List of National Basketball Association players with 50 or more points in a playoff game
List of National Basketball Association players with most points in a game
List of National Basketball Association players with most steals in a game
List of National Basketball Association top rookie scoring averages
List of NCAA Division I men's basketball players with 2000 points and 1000 rebounds

References

External links

Basketball Hall of Fame profile

RememberTheABA.com Rick Barry page
1972 Jim O'Brien biographical article on Rick Barry
Rick Barry and Rod Brooks Home Page at KNBR Radio
Rick Barry Career Statistics 
A Voice Crying in the Wilderness

1944 births
Living people
All-American college men's basketball players
American Basketball Association announcers
American men's basketball players
American people of Lithuanian descent
American sports radio personalities
Basketball coaches from New Jersey
Basketball players from Colorado Springs, Colorado
Basketball players from New Jersey
Big3 coaches
Continental Basketball Association coaches
Golden State Warriors players
Golf writers and broadcasters
Houston Rockets players
Miami Hurricanes men's basketball players
Naismith Memorial Basketball Hall of Fame inductees
National Basketball Association All-Stars
National Basketball Association broadcasters
National Basketball Association players with retired numbers
New York Nets players
Oakland Oaks players
People from Roselle Park, New Jersey
Radio personalities from San Francisco
San Francisco Warriors draft picks
San Francisco Warriors players
Small forwards
Sportspeople from Elizabeth, New Jersey
Tennis commentators
United States Basketball League coaches
Washington Caps players